Michael Karl Rutter (born 18 April 1972 in Wordsley, Staffordshire) nicknamed "The Blade", is a British motorcycle racer. He currently races in the National Superstock 1000 Championship aboard a BMW S1000RR. He has a reputation for being at his best in wet conditions and his favourite circuit is Oulton Park. He won 29 British Superbike Championship races with the most recent being at Silverstone in 2010, and finished as series runner-up twice. He has also contested MotoGP and World Superbike Championship events.

During 2015, Rutter was a temporary replacement rider for Gearlink Kawasaki in BSB, but mainly concentrated on selected road events backed by his personal sponsor Batham's brewery, having lost his 2014-ride on a Bathams IWR BMW partway through the season.

Personal
Michael Rutter's father, Tony Rutter, was a successful motorcycle racer in the 1970s, winning 7 Isle of Man TT races, and four times world champion in the TT Formula Two series. Michael lives in Bridgnorth, Shropshire.

Career
Rutter raced trials in his teens and began circuit racing in 1989. His first full season in the British Superbike Championship was 1993; he finished 8th overall and also made his first four World Superbike Championship starts that year. He finished in the overall BSB top six every year from 1994 to 1998, coming in third overall in 1997. His win at Donington Park in the wet in 1995 broke the duopoly of Steve Hislop and Jamie Whitham. His first World Superbike podium came at the same circuit in 1997. He won at Oulton Park and Donington in 1998. Tellingly, each of these standout results was achieved in wet conditions.

He spent 1999 in the 500cc World Championship, scoring occasional points but not being among the front runners. He returned to the domestic series for 2000 on a Ray Stringer private Yamaha. Again, a wet race provided his only victory. Still, his road racing results dwarfed what he managed on track.

After a solid 2001, Rutter came second to Steve Hislop in 2002 with the renegade Ducati team, including eight wins and five poles. He was third for the team in 2003, this time dwarfed by Shane Byrne.

He spent 2004 and 2005 with the factory Honda team. In 2004 he was never off the front row and took 11 podiums in the first 12 races, but a midseason run of 6 non-podiums gave Suzuki's John Reynolds the title. In 2005 Honda team-mate Ryuichi Kiyonari had the better of Rutter, who came 3rd overall and lost the ride for 2006.

For 2006 he rejoined his former Monstermob boss Paul Bird, now running semi-works Hondas with Eddie Stobart funding. He finished third first time out, but only repeated this feat once more throughout the season, finishing seventh overall and losing the ride after the 2006 season. For 2007, Rutter was the sole rider for the MSS Discovery Kawasaki squad, which moved up from British Supersport to contest British Superbikes for the second time (the first was with Julien da Costa in 2005). This was his least successful BSB season ever, as the Kawasaki was not a competitive bike.

Michael Rutter competed in the 2008 British Superbike Championship on a "North West 200" branded Ducati SBK RS08, a team entered to promote this famed road racing event in Northern Ireland. He finished 6th overall with a single win, and made his 300th BSB start at the final meeting of the year.

In 2009 Rutter rode for Rob Mac Racing Yamaha. The partnership was comparatively short-lived with Rutter leaving the team in May 2009. Rutter raced various machines for the rest of the season, with little success.

For 2010 Rutter took his Bathams Brewery sponsorship to the Ridersmotorcycles.com team, partnering Martin Jessopp on their Ducatis. He scored the team's first win at Knockhill, in wet conditions. He also led race two at Snetterton, but was stopped by a broken gear lever. He took pole at the Brands Hatch Grand Prix circuit, and was leading race one when it was stopped for rain, ultimately coming second to Alastair Seeley.

Real road racing
Rutter is also a road racing rider, having won 14 times at the North West 200 festival in Northern Ireland. He has 7 wins at the Isle of Man TT races, 5 of which were in the TT Zero class.

Macau Grand Prix

He holds the record of most wins at the Macau Grand Prix. In November 2018, Rutter came second, riding a Honda RC213V provided by his new sponsor, Faye Ho, granddaughter of Macau-based businessman Stanley Ho. The race was won by Peter Hickman on his usual Smith's BMW S1000RR, but also sponsored for the event by Ho's business, Aspire-Ho.

Isle of Man
On 4 June 2012 Michael Rutter became the first person to lap the Isle of Man Mountain Course at over 100 mph on an electric motorcycle. His lap time was 22 min 05.05 sec (average speed 102.50 mph) however he did not win the £10,000 prize for this feat as the time was set in a practice session and not in a race. In the previous year's TT Zero race he had narrowly missed out on the prize with a lap at an average speed of 99.604 mph. On 6 June Michael Rutter broke the 100 mph barrier in the TT Zero race winning with a lap time of 21:45.33, averaging 104.056 mph.

Career Record

Road Racing
1995
2nd North West 200

1996
1st North West 200
3rd IOM Formula One TT

1997
2nd IOM Formula One TT
3rd IOM Junior TT

1998
1st Macau GP
1st North West 200
1st IOM Junior TT
2nd IOM Formula One TT

2000
2nd IOM Formula One TT
2nd IOM Senior TT
3rd IOM Production 1000 TT
1st Macau GP (Formula One)
1st Macau GP (Senior)
1st North West 200
1st North West 200
1st North West 200

2002
1st Macau GP

2003
1st North West 200
1st Macau GP

2004
1st North West 200
1st Macau GP20051st North West 200
1st Macau GP20062nd North West 200
2nd Macau GP20081st North West 200
2nd Macau GP20111st IOM TT Zero
1st Macau GP20121st IOM TT Zero
3rd IOM TT Supertwins
1st Macau GP20131st IOM TT Zero20153rd IOM TT Supertwins20172nd NW200 Supertwin 1
2nd NW200 Superbike 1
1st NW200 Supertwin 2
3rd NW200 Superstock 2
1st IOM TT Supertwin20181st IOM TT Zero
3rd IOM TT Supertwin
2nd Macau GP

Circuit Racing19913rd Superteen Championship19923rd National 250GP Championship
First Superbike Race19937th British Superbike Championship19946th British Superbike Championship19955th British Superbike Championship19964th British Superbike Championship19973rd British Superbike Championship
3rd World Superbike race at Brands Hatch19986th British Superbike Championship1999World 500 GP Championship (best 11th)20009th British Superbike Championship20016th British Superbike Championship20022nd British Superbike Championship20033rd British Superbike Championship20042nd British Superbike Championship20053rd British Superbike Championship20067th British Superbike Championship200712th British Superbike Championship20086th British Superbike Championship200916th British Superbike Championship20105th British Superbike Championship20118th British Superbike Championship201219th British Superbike Championship201318th British Superbike Championship201418th British Superbike Championship201531st British Superbike Championship2016'''
4th National Superstock 1000 Championship

British Superbike Championship

1. – Rutter qualified for "The Showdown" part of the BSB season, thus before the Croft round he was awarded 500 points plus the podium credits he had gained throughout the season. Podium credits are given to anyone finishing 1st, 2nd or 3rd, with 3,2 and 1 points awarded respectively.

2. – Josh Brookes collided with Rutter, causing Rutter to suffer broken ribs and miss the following 4 races.

References

1973 births
Living people
Rutter, Tony
Rutter, Tony
British motorcycle racers
English motorcycle racers
British Superbike Championship riders
500cc World Championship riders
Superbike World Championship riders